Tage Møller (14 March 1914 – 14 February 2006) was a Danish cyclist. He competed in the individual and team road race events at the 1936 Summer Olympics.

References

External links
 

1914 births
2006 deaths
Danish male cyclists
Olympic cyclists of Denmark
Cyclists at the 1936 Summer Olympics
Cyclists from Copenhagen